Peri J. Bearman (born 1953) is an academic scholar of Islamic law. She was the Associate Director of the Islamic Legal Studies Program at Harvard Law School. She is also currently the Editor-in-Chief and Islam section editor for the Journal of the American Oriental Society (JAOS).

Life
Peri Bearman took degrees in Arabic and Islamic Studies from the University of Leiden. She worked for Brill Publishers as the senior editor for the Middle East, and was a member of the editorial board of the second edition of the Encyclopaedia of Islam.

Selected publications
 (ed. with Th. Bianquis, C. E. Bosworth, E. van Donzel, W. P. Heinrichs ) Encyclopædia of Islam, 2nd edition., 12 vols. and one vol. index, Leiden: E.J. Brill, 1960–2005
 (ed.) The Encyclopaedia of Islam, new edition. Index of subjects, Leiden : E.J. Brill, 1993-.
 (ed. with Rudolph Peters and Frank E. Vogel) The Islamic School of Law: Evolution, Devolution, and Progress, Cambridge, Massachusetts: Islamic Legal Studies Program, Harvard Law School : Distributed by Harvard University Press, 2005. Harvard series in Islamic law, 2.
 (ed. with Wolfhart Heinrichs and Bernard G. Weiss) The Law Applied: Contextualizing the Islamic Shari'a. A Volume in Honor of Frank E. Vogel, London: I.B. Tauris, 2008.
 Peri Bearman, "Islamic Law: In the MENA Region," in Oxford Encyclopedia of the Modern World (editor-in-chief: Peter N. Stearns), 4 vols., New York: Oxford University Press, 2008.
 senior editor, The Oxford Encyclopedia of Islam and Politics (editor-in-chief: Emad Shahin ), 2 vols., New York: Oxford University Press, 2013.
 (ed. with Rudolph Peters) The Ashgate Research Companion to Islamic Law, Farnham, Surrey, UK: Ashgate, 2014.
 Peri Bearman, ''A History of the'' Encyclopaedia of Islam, Atlanta: Lockwood Press, 2018.

References

1953 births
Living people
Leiden University alumni
Harvard Law School faculty
Book editors
American Islamic studies scholars